The Clausura 2012 season was the 28th edition of Primera División de Fútbol de El Salvador since its establishment of an Apertura and Clausura format. Isidro Metapán headed into this tournament as the defending champions. The season began on January 8, 2012 and concluded in mid-year. Like previous years, the league consisted of 10 teams, each playing a home and away game against the other clubs for a total of 18 games, respectively. The top four teams by the end of the regular season took part in the playoffs.

Stadia and locations

Personnel and sponsoring

Managerial changes

Before the start of the season

During the regular season

League table

Positions by round

Results

Playoffs

Semi-finals

First leg

Second leg

Isidro Metapán won 3-2 on aggregate.

Águila won 5-2 on aggregate.

Final

Player statistics

Top scorers

 Updated to games played on April 15, 2012. 
 Post-season goals are not included, only regular season goals.

Bookings

 Updated to games played on April 15, 2012.

Goalkeepers

 Updated to games played on April 15, 2012. 
 Post-season goals are not included, only regular season goals.

Hat-tricks

Individual awards

Season statistics

Scoring
First goal of the season:  José Otoniel Salinas for Vista Hermosa against FAS, 4 minutes (January 7, 2012)
Fastest goal in a match:2 minutes -  José Lemus for Atlético Marte against Alianza (March 4, 2012)
Goal scored at the latest point in a match: 90+10 minutes  Alexander Larin for Atlético Marte against FAS (January 21, 2012)
First penalty Kick of the season:  Anel Canales for Luis Ángel Firpo against Atlético Marte, 48 minutes (January 8, 2012)
Widest winning margin: 5 Goals
Once Municipal 5–0 FAS (January 25, 2012)
Águila 5–0 Atlético Marte (March 8, 2012)
Juventud Independiente 5–0 UES (April 4, 2012)
Águila 5–0 Vista Hermosa (April 4, 2012)
First hat-trick of the season:  Marvin Monterrosa for Isidro Metapán against Vista Hermosa (March 28, 2012)
First own goal of the season:  Carlos Arévalo (Alianza) for UES, 37 minutes (January 7, 2012)
Most goals by one team in a match: 5 Goals
Once Municipal 5–0 FAS (January 25, 2012)
Águila 5–0 Atlético Marte (March 8, 2012)
Juventud Independiente 5–0 UES (April 4, 2012)
Águila 5–0 Vista Hermosa (April 4, 2012)
Most goals in one half by one team:
Most goals scored by losing team: 3 Goals
UES 3–4 Luis Ángel Firpo (April 15, 2012)
Most goals by one player in a single match: 3 Goals
 Marvin Monterrosa for Isidro Metapán against Vista Hermosa (March 28, 2012)
 Juan Carlos Reyes for Juventud Independiente against UES (April 4, 2012)

Discipline
First yellow card of the season:  Nelson Bonilla for Alianza against UES, 5 minutes (January 7, 2012)
First red card of the season:  Nelson Bonilla for Alianza against UES, 9 minutes (January 7, 2012)
Card given at latest point in a game: Red  José Enrique Rodríguez for Juventud Independiente, 90+3 minutes against UES (February 11, 2012)

Aggregate table

List of foreign players in the league
This is a list of foreign players in Clausura 2012. The following players:
have played at least one apertura game for the respective club.
have not been capped for the El Salvador national football team on any level, independently from the birthplace

A new rule was introduced a few season ago, that clubs can only have three foreign players per club and can only add a new player if there is an injury or player/s is released.

C.D. Águila
  Glaúber da Silva
  Rómulo
  TBA

Alianza F.C.
  Yaikel Pérez
  Sean Fraser
  Willer Souza

Atlético Marte
  James Owusu-Ansah
  Alcides Bandera
  Garrick Gordon

Juventud Independiente
  Juan Carlos Reyes
  Cristian Adolfo González
  Maximiliano Alexis Villega

C.D. FAS
  Alejandro Bentos
  Rodolfo Rodríguez (footballer)
  Marcio Teruel

 (player released mid season)

C.D. Luis Ángel Firpo
  Anel Canales
  Luis Torres
  Ederson Buendía

A.D. Isidro Metapán
  Ernesto Aquino
  Allan Kardeck
  Leonardo Da Silva

Once Municipal
  Pablo Hütt
  Andrés Medina
  Anthony Basile

UES
  John Castillo
  Gustavo Peña
  TBA

Vista Hermosa
  Bonel Ávila
  Juan Camilo Mejía
  Pompilio Cacho Valerio
  Hugo Sarmiento

References

External links
 El Grafico League Coverage 
 elsalvadorfc.com 
 culebritamacheteada.com

Primera División de Fútbol Profesional Clausura seasons
El
1

es:Torneo Apertura 2011 (El Salvador)
fr:Tournoi d'ouverture du championnat du Salvador de football 2011